Bruce Philip Martin (born 25 April 1980) is a New Zealand international cricketer who played Test cricket for the national team. At domestic level he played for the Northern Districts and Auckland in the State Championship and Northland in the Hawke Cup. Martin played as a slow left-arm orthodox spin bowler and right-handed batsman.

Early life and career
He was born in Whangarei and attended school in Kerikeri in the Bay of Islands.

Martin played three Test matches and nine One Day Internationals for the New Zealand's under-19 side, was selected for the New Zealand A side in 2004 and in the Emerging Players tournament in Australia in 2011.

Senior career
Martin enjoyed an outstanding debut season for Northern Districts in 1999/2000 taking 37 wickets, which led to him being called into the squad for the Test against Australia, and touring England with New Zealand A. He was named the Northern Districts cricketer of the year in 2003/04. He continued to play for Northern Districts until the end of the 2009/10 season, after which he moved to Auckland. He finally made his Test debut for New Zealand in 2013, playing all three Tests in the home series against England. He played two further Tests in tours to England and Bangladesh but was dropped after poor performances, and played his last matches for Auckland in the following 2013/14 season.

References

External links
 

1980 births
Living people
New Zealand cricketers
New Zealand Test cricketers
Auckland cricketers
Northern Districts cricketers
Cricketers from Whangārei